Yamanasaurus (meaning "Yamana lizard") is an extinct genus of saltasaurine titanosaur dinosaur from the Río Playas Formation of Ecuador, which dates to the Maastrichtian epoch of the Cretaceous period (approximately 66.9 million years ago). The type and only species is Yamanasaurus lojaensis. It is the first non-avian dinosaur described from Ecuador.

The holotype, consisting of fragments of a humerus, ulna, tibia, two sacral vertebrae and a single caudal, was discovered in 2017.

References

Saltasaurids
Maastrichtian life
Late Cretaceous dinosaurs of South America
Cretaceous Ecuador
Fossils of Ecuador
Fossil taxa described in 2019